Martin Keoghan (born 9 December 1998) is an Irish hurler who plays as a right wing-forward for the Kilkenny senior team.

Born in Tullaroan, County Kilkenny, Keoghan first played competitive hurling at St. Kieran's College, winning back-to-back All-Ireland medals in 2015 and 2016. He simultaneously came to prominence at juvenile and underage levels with the Tullaroan club, winning minor and under-21 championship medals in 2016.

Keoghan made his debut on the inter-county scene at the age of seventeen when he was selected for the Kilkenny minor team. He enjoyed one championship season with the minor team, however, it ended without success. He subsequently joined the Kilkenny intermediate team, winning an All-Ireland medal in 2017 before winning a Leinster medal with the under-21 team. Keoghan made his senior debut during the 2017 league.

Career statistics

Honours

St. Kieran's College
All-Ireland Colleges Senior Hurling Championship: 2015, 2016
Leinster Colleges Senior Hurling Championship: 2015, 2016

Tullaroan
All-Ireland Intermediate Club Hurling Championship: 2020
Leinster Intermediate Club Hurling Championship: 2019
Kilkenny Intermediate Hurling Championship: 2019
Kilkenny Under-21 B Hurling Championship: 2016
Kilkenny Minor Hurling Championship: 2016

Kilkenny 
Leinster Senior Hurling Championship: 2020, 2021, 2022
National Hurling League: 2018, 2021
All-Ireland Intermediate Hurling Championship: 2017
Leinster Intermediate Hurling Championship: 2017
Leinster Under-21 Hurling Championship: 2017

References

1998 births
Living people
Tullaroan hurlers
Kilkenny inter-county hurlers